Psilota is a genus of small black hoverflies with long wings, from the family Syrphidae, in the order Diptera. They are one of the few hoverfly genera that do not have a venia spuria in the wings. The larvae feed on tree sap.

Systematics 
Extant species:

References

External links
Genus description

Diptera of Europe
Diptera of North America
Hoverfly genera
Eumerini
Taxa named by Johann Wilhelm Meigen